Mukharby Ulbashev (Russian: Мухарбий Магомедович Ульбашев; born 15 May 1960) is a Russian politician serving as a senator from Kabardino-Balkaria since 23 September 2019.

Ulbashev is under personal sanctions introduced by the European Union, the United Kingdom, the USA, Canada, Switzerland, Australia, Ukraine, New Zealand, for ratifying the decisions of the "Treaty of Friendship, Cooperation and Mutual Assistance between the Russian Federation and the Donetsk People's Republic and between the Russian Federation and the Luhansk People’s Republic" and providing political and economic support for Russia's annexation of Ukrainian territories.

Biography

Mukharbii Ulbashev was born on 15 May 1960 in Kabardino-Balkarian Autonomous Soviet Socialist Republic. In 1982, he graduated from the Kabardino-Balkaria State Agrarian University. Afterward he worked as a doctor in the Kabardino-Balkarian sanitary and veterinary detachment. From 1987 to 1990, he was the secretary of the Kabardino-Balkarian branch of Komsomol. From 1990 to 1993, he was the Chairman of the Permanent Commission of the Supreme Council of the Kabardino-Balkarian Republic. In 1995, he was elected deputy of the State Duma of the Russian Empire of the Second Convocation. From 2000 to 2001, Ulbashev was appointed as an advisor to the Head of the Kabardino-Balkarian Republic. Later he became the Senator from Kabardino-Balkaria. In 2014 and 2021, he was re-appointed to this position.

References

Living people
1960 births
United Russia politicians
21st-century Russian politicians
Members of the Federation Council of Russia (after 2000)